Furious Angels is the debut and as of 2023, the only studio album by Australian music producer Rob Dougan. It was released on 1 July 2002 in the United Kingdom and in July 2003 in the United States. It was nominated for the 2004 Grammy Award for Best Boxed or Special Limited Edition Package.

Release
Furious Angels was originally released as a single-disc album (14 tracks for its world edition, 15 for its home UK edition) dominated by vocal tracks. It was then rereleased as a two-disc album, disc one featuring all 15 songs and disc two featuring 10 instrumental versions of the vocal songs from the first disc, as well as two music videos; there's also been a special-edition set adding a booklet of lyrics and photographs. The album was written, produced and mainly financed by Rob Dougan himself, rather than a studio, with funds generally raised through the licensing of tracks from the album to film and television.

A 2003 article in The Guardian noted:

Track listing

Disc one

Disc two (instrumental)

Influences
The introduction to "Clubbed to Death" is taken directly from the main theme of Edward Elgar's "Enigma Variations". The piano introduction to "I'm Not Driving Anymore" and the orchestral part of "Clubbed to Death 2" (only on the UK version of the album) is built around Frédéric Chopin's "Prelude No. 4 in E-minor" (from Preludes, opus 28). The "Instrumental" and the orchestral part of "One And The Same" are variations of Johann Sebastian Bach's "Concerto for 2 Violins in D Minor, BWV1043".

Song usage
Some tracks from the album have been licensed for use in feature films, advertising, and television, including the Matrix film series and the Top Gear television show. The song "Furious Angels" is used by the Los Angeles Lakers to introduce visiting teams. The instrumental version of this song also appears in the opening sequence of the video game Grand Prix 3. Several shows in the Law & Order franchise have used tracks from Furious Angels as an opening credits theme for UK airings: "I'm Not Driving Anymore" was used by Law & Order and Law & Order: Special Victims Unit, and "There's Only Me" was used by Law & Order: Criminal Intent.

Charts

References

External links 
 

Rob Dougan albums
Furious Angels (1-disc original release)
Cheeky Records albums